

Winners and Nominees

Films with multiple nominations 
These films received multiple nominations:

See also

 1993 in film
 66th Academy Awards
 47th British Academy Film Awards
 51st Golden Globe Awards

References

 

Golden Raspberry Awards
Golden Raspberry Awards ceremonies
Golden Raspberry Awards
Golden Raspberry Awards
Golden Raspberry Awards
Golden Raspberry